Emma Pierson (Arlington, Virginia) is an American computer scientist who specializes in artificial intelligence. She graduated from Thomas Jefferson High School for Science and Technology. She earned a degree in physics and then a master's in computer science from Stanford University, where she studied cognitive psychology and biocomputation. She was awarded a Rhodes Scholarship for her work in using computers to solve biological problems, and specifically to work on cancer treatments.

For Nicholas Kristof's "On the Ground" (in The New York Times), she contributed "How to Get More Women to Join the Debate", a contribution on gender and social media, and a follow-up on her methodology. Pierson works with the GTEx Consortium using algorithms to study tissue-specific gene expression in an attempt to understand complex diseases in which limited availability of samples makes traditional research methods impractical.

External links
 Obsession with Regression (blog)

References

American computer scientists
Living people
People from Arlington County, Virginia
Scientists from Virginia
Stanford University School of Engineering alumni
Thomas Jefferson High School for Science and Technology alumni
Year of birth missing (living people)
American Rhodes Scholars